In the U. S. state of Pennsylvania, Franklin Township may refer to:

 Franklin Township, Adams County, Pennsylvania
 Franklin Township, Beaver County, Pennsylvania
 Franklin Township, Bradford County, Pennsylvania
 Franklin Township, Butler County, Pennsylvania
 Franklin Township, Carbon County, Pennsylvania
 Franklin Township, Chester County, Pennsylvania
 Franklin Township, Columbia County, Pennsylvania
 Franklin Township, Erie County, Pennsylvania
 Franklin Township, Fayette County, Pennsylvania
 Franklin Township, Greene County, Pennsylvania
 Franklin Township, Huntingdon County, Pennsylvania
 Franklin Township, Luzerne County, Pennsylvania
 Franklin Township, Lycoming County, Pennsylvania
 Franklin Township, Snyder County, Pennsylvania
 Franklin Township, Susquehanna County, Pennsylvania
 Franklin Township, York County, Pennsylvania

See also 
 East Franklin Township, Armstrong County, Pennsylvania
 North Franklin Township, Washington County, Pennsylvania
 South Franklin Township, Washington County, Pennsylvania
 West Franklin Township, Armstrong County, Pennsylvania

Pennsylvania township disambiguation pages